Isaac Froimovich (21 December 1918 – April 1988) was a Chilean water polo player. He competed in the men's tournament at the 1948 Summer Olympics.

References

1918 births
1988 deaths
Chilean male water polo players
Olympic water polo players of Chile
Water polo players at the 1948 Summer Olympics
Sportspeople from Valparaíso